Ginger soda can refer to: 
 Ginger ale
 Ginger beer.